Joe Cooper (born September 18, 1888 in Kittanning, Pennsylvania – August 7, 1915 in West Des Moines, Iowa) was an American racecar driver. Cooper was killed in a race in West Des Moines.

Indy 500 results

References

Official Indianapolis 500 race and driver stats.

1888 births
1915 deaths
Indianapolis 500 drivers
People from Kittanning, Pennsylvania
Racing drivers from Pennsylvania
Racing drivers who died while racing
Sports deaths in Iowa
People from West Des Moines, Iowa